This is a list of cities and towns in Eritrea by population.  It includes all settlements with a population of over 5,000.

Other settlements
Adi Tekelezan 
 Afabet 
 Areza 
Badme 
Bisha 
 Dairo Paulos
Debaysima 
 Digsa 
 Emba Derho 
Felhit 
Filfil
 Hadas  
 Hazega 
 Kudo-Felasi 
Matara 
 Mai Mine 
Mersa Gulbub 
Mersa Teklay 
Om Hajer 
Per Tokar
Quatit 
Rahayta 
Sebderat 
Tserona 
Tsazega 
Zula 
Zahgir
Adi-Abeto
Kudofelasi
Molki
Shambuko
Golij
Tara Emni
shakaeyamo
Emni hayli
knafna
Tsorona
Enda gergs
Haykota
Fortosawa
Sh'eb
Ela bered
Adi Qontsi
Meka'ika

External links 
 Geopolis, about urban areas and urbanization in the world

Eritrea, List of cities in
 
Cities
Eritrea